Pope is an unincorporated community in Marengo County, Alabama, United States.

History
A post office called Pope was established in 1938, and remained in operation until it was discontinued in 1967. The community was named after the first postmaster, Hubert C. Pope.

References

Unincorporated communities in Marengo County, Alabama
Unincorporated communities in Alabama